Eric L. Levinson is an American jurist and lawyer. In 2014, he unsuccessfully sought a seat as an associate justice of the Supreme Court of North Carolina.
He received his  undergraduate degree from the University of Georgia and his Juris Doctor degree from the University of North Carolina at Chapel Hill School of Law.
 He also completed a public policy program in comparative economics and politics through the Fund for American Studies in Washington, D.C., and an international finance studies program in London, England, as part of his undergraduate requirements.

Levinson served as an N.C. prosecutor and as an N.C. District and Family Court Judge prior to his election to the N.C. Court of Appeals in 2002. 
In 2006, he unsuccessfully sought a seat on the Supreme Court of North Carolina. In 2007, Levinson resigned from the Court of Appeals, accepting a Bush Administration appointment as the Justice Attache to the U.S. Embassy in Baghdad, Iraq for the United States Department of Justice. Thereafter, he consulted in Kabul, Afghanistan, providing counsel on the establishment of new commercial courts venues. Former N.C. Gov. Beverly Perdue appointed Levinson to the North Carolina Superior Court in 2009.

Judicial and Prosecution Experience 

Judge Levinson joined the District Attorney’s Office in Cabarrus and Rowan Counties, N.C. as a felony prosecutor following law school, and he prosecuted drug, property, sexual assault, and homicide offenders until he was elected to the N.C. judiciary in 1996 as a District and Family Court Judge.  In this role, he was recognized for implementing best-practices in our criminal and child support enforcement courts and became a N.C. Certified Juvenile Court Judge.

In 2002, Levinson was elected statewide as one of fifteen members of the N.C. Court of Appeals in Raleigh, where he served as an Associate Judge and the Court's youngest member and authored hundreds of legal opinions in disputes and lawsuits concerning virtually every area of the law.

In 2007, Levinson was appointed by the Bush Administration as the Justice Attache to Iraq for the U.S. Department of Justice.  As Justice Attache, Levinson managed the U.S. government's diplomatic relationship with the Iraqi judiciary and its Chief Justice, Medhat al Mahmoud, and advanced the establishment of Major Crimes Courts where terrorists were prosecuted.  Although stationed at the U.S. Embassy inside the International Zone, Levinson traveled to other population centers and provinces throughout Iraq, meeting with military and civilian leaders who were responsible for the administration of the rule of law in Iraq.

In 2008, he worked in Kabul, Afghanistan as a Rule of Law and Courts Advisor.  In this role, he collaborated with members of the Supreme Court of Afghanistan and helped draft and advance guidelines and procedures for establishing and resourcing commercial courts in Afghanistan to adjudicate business, contract and related civil conflicts.

Upon his return to the U.S. in early 2009, a bipartisan group of Republican and Democratic lawmakers, business professionals, attorneys and community stakeholders endorsed his appointment to the N.C. Superior Court.  As a Superior Court Judge, Levinson holds court in counties all across western, central and eastern N.C. and presides over violent crimes against persons (homicide, sexual assault, armed robbery, serious assault) as well as civil conflicts (complex business disputes, class action, property).

Adjunct Instructor 

Levinson has taught as an adjunct instructor at a variety of N.C. colleges and universities, including (1) UNC-Chapel Hill School of Government, where he taught an offering on Ethics in the Masters of Public Administration Program; (2) the Charlotte School of Law, where he has taught offerings on Juvenile Law, Remedies, Appellate Advocacy, and Civil Litigation; and (3) the University of North Carolina at Charlotte, where he has taught courses in American Constitutional Law.  Levinson has presented lectures to other state court judges through the National Council of Juvenile and Family Court Judges and the UNC-Chapel Hill Institute of Government.

Community 

Judge Levinson presently serves as a member of the board of advisors for Serving Alto Cayma, a mission originating in the Charlotte area that serves a large community in Peru; the Board of Advisors for the Wildacres Leadership Institute, a leading leadership organization based in Raleigh; and the Administration of Justice Committee for the North Carolina Bar Association.  Levinson is an active member of Charlotte Rotary, too.

Levinson was chosen as a "Friday Fellow" in 2006—named after former UNC system president and respected educator William C. Friday—and completed a two-year leadership and human relations program sponsored by the Wildacres Leadership Institute.  Levinson was formerly a board member of Substance Abuse Prevention Services; Hands on Charlotte; and the Alumni Council for the Fund for American Studies, a Washington-based nonprofit engaged in the education of college students about public policy, journalism, and philanthropy.  Levinson was also formerly involved in the Charlotte Jaycees and, in 2003, was honored with the Fund for American Studies' Outstanding Young Alumnus Award.

Education 

Judge Eric Levinson is a native North Carolinian who gained his Juris Doctor from the University of North Carolina at Chapel Hill School of Law where he was president of the Student Bar Association.  He obtained a BBA in Finance, cum laude, at the University of Georgia, where he was an Honors Program student.  He also completed the Institute on Comparative Political and Economic Systems through the Fund for American Studies in Washington, D.C. and Georgetown University, and completed an overseas studies program in International Finance hosted by the University of London, England.  He is a certified Superior Court mediator, too, having completed the required training in 2004, and is an N.C. Certified Juvenile Court Judge.

Electoral history

In 2014, Levinson unsuccessfully sought a seat as an associate justice of the NC Supreme Court.  He finished second in a three-way May 6 primary election with 328,062 votes (36.57%), behind first place finisher Robin Hudson (the incumbent), who received 381,836 votes (42.56%).  Jeanette Doran finished third with 187,273 votes (20.87%).  Hudson and Levinson advanced to the general election, which was held on November 4.  Hudson defeated Levinson by receiving 1,283,478 votes (52.46%) to Levinson's 1,163,022 votes (47.54%).  Robin Hudson was re-elected to the Supreme Court for another eight-year term that expired in 2022.

References

North Carolina Court of Appeals judges
Living people
Year of birth missing (living people)